The steamboat Ticonderoga is one of two remaining side-paddle-wheel passenger steamers with a vertical beam engine of the type that provided freight and passenger service on America's bays, lakes and rivers from the early 19th to the mid-20th centuries. Commissioned by the Champlain Transportation Company, Ticonderoga was built in 1906 at the Shelburne Shipyard in Shelburne, Vermont on Lake Champlain.

The other is the Eureka, built as the Ukiah for the Northwestern Pacific Railroad in California, renamed after a post-World War I reconstruction, and passed on to NWP owner Southern Pacific in 1942.  The Eureka remained in service until SP's ferries were discontinued in 1958, and it was donated for museum display, where it remains to this day at Aquatic Park in San Francisco, California.  Unlike the Ticonderoga however, the Eureka is still afloat.

Ticonderoga measures 220 feet in length and 59 feet in beam, with a displacement of 892 tons. Her steam engine, handmade by the Fletcher Engine Company of Hoboken, New Jersey, was powered by two coal-fired boilers and could achieve a maximum speed of  (14.77 knots).

History
The ship's crew numbered twenty-eight, including the captain, pilots, mate, deckhands, engineers, and firemen to operate the boat. The purser, stewardess, freight clerk, bartender, hall boys, cook, waiters, scullion, and mess boys attended to passengers and freight arrangements.

Initially, Ticonderoga served a north-south route on Lake Champlain. Daily, she docked at Westport, New York, where she met the New York City evening train. The next morning she carried travelers and freight northward to St. Albans, Vermont. In addition to passengers, Ticonderoga transported local farm produce, livestock, and dry goods on a regular basis, and during both world wars ferried U.S. troops between Plattsburgh, New York and Burlington, Vermont. Over the years she also operated on the east-west run from Burlington to Port Kent, New York and had a brief career as a floating casino.

When more modern ferries made her obsolete, Ticonderoga managed to persist in operation as an excursion boat for several years; however, by 1950 the steady decline in business threatened her future. Ralph Nading Hill saved Ticonderoga from the scrap heap when he persuaded Electra Havemeyer Webb to buy her for her growing museum. While the Shelburne Museum attempted to keep her in operation, the steamboat era had passed making it difficult to find qualified personnel to operate and maintain the aging vessel.

Relocation
In 1954 the Shelburne Museum decided to move Ticonderoga overland to the museum grounds. At the end of the summer season the boat paddled into a newly dug, water-filled basin off Shelburne Bay and floated over a railroad carriage resting on specially laid tracks. The water was then pumped out of the basin, and Ticonderoga settled onto the railroad carriage. During the winter of 1955 Ticonderoga was hauled across highways, over a swamp, through woods and fields, and across the tracks of the Rutland Railway to reach her permanent mooring on the Shelburne Museum grounds.

Much of her interior was restored to its original grandeur. The dining room and stateroom halls retain their butternut and cherry paneling and ceilings their gold stenciling. The barbershop, captain's quarters, dining room, and promenade deck contain furniture and accessories used in the Ticonderoga and other Lake Champlain steamboats.

Ticonderoga was declared a National Historic Landmark in 1964 under the name Ticonderoga (Side-paddle-wheel Lakeboat).

Gallery

See also
 Historic American Engineering Record
 List of National Historic Landmarks in Vermont
 National Register of Historic Places listings in Chittenden County, Vermont

References

Ticonderoga

External links

Shelburne Museum website

Historic American Engineering Record in Vermont
Museum ships in Vermont
National Historic Landmarks in Vermont
Steamboats of the United States
Ships on the National Register of Historic Places in Vermont
Shelburne Museum
National Register of Historic Places in Chittenden County, Vermont